Random Acts of Kindness Day is a day to celebrate and encourage random acts of kindness. "It's just a day to celebrate kindness and the whole pay it forward mentality", said Tracy Van Kalsbeek, executive director of the Stratford Perth Community Foundation, in 2016, where the day is celebrated on November 4. It is celebrated on September 1 in New Zealand and on February 17 in the US.

Background

The Random Acts of Kindness Foundation (RAK) was founded in 1995 in the US. It is a nonprofit headquartered in Denver, Colorado. The founder of the group is Will Glennon. Glennon is currently the Chairman of World Kindness, USA.

Random Acts of Kindness (RAK) day began in 2004 in New Zealand.  Promoters of the day suggest paying for another person's meal in drive-thrus, letting someone go ahead in line, buying extra at the grocery store and donating it to a food pantry, buying flowers for someone, helping someone change a flat tire, posting anonymous sticky notes with validating or uplifting messages around for people to find, complimenting a colleague on their work, sending an encouraging text to someone, taking muffins to work, letting a car into the traffic ahead of you, washing someone else's car, taking a gift to new neighbors, or paying the bus fare for another passenger.

See also
Altruism
 Civic engagement
 Community service
Feed the Deed
Free Money Day
 Global Youth Service Day
 Good Deeds Day
 International Volunteer Day
 International Year of Volunteers
Kindness
List of awards for volunteerism and community service
 Make A Difference Day
 Mandela Day
 Mitzvah Day
 MLK Day of service
 National Philanthropy Day (USA and Canada)
 National Public Lands Day (USA)
 National Volunteer Week (US)
Parable of the Good Samaritan
 Pay it forward
Random act of kindness
 Sewa Day
 World Kindness Day

References

Unofficial observances
September observances
Kindness
International observances
November observances
February observances